Alfredo Raúl Cascini (born 7 April 1971) is a former Argentine football midfielder, who also has Italian nationality. His first club was Platense and has also played for Estudiantes de La Plata, Independiente and Boca Juniors. After retiring, Cascini worked as a pundit for Fox Sports in Argentina.

In 2001, Independiente owed Cascini money but they agreed Toulouse would cover it. However, Toulouse went bankrupt and were not able to cover the amount so he filed a lawsuit.

At Boca, Cascini played a total of 113 matches and 2 goals in all competitions.

Coaching career
In the summer 2011, Cascini was appointed manager of Los Andes with Marcelo Delgado as his assistant. The duo resigned on 9 September 2012.

On 19 December 2019, when Cascini's friend and former pro-player Juan Román Riquelme was appointed vice-president and head of the football department of Boca Juniors, Cascini also joined the club as a member of Boca Juniors Soccer Council.

Personal life
Raúl Alfredo Cascini's son, Juan Cascini is also a footballer.

Honours
Boca Juniors
 Primera División Argentina: Apertura 2003
 Copa Libertadores: 2003
 Copa Intercontinental: 2003
 Copa Sudamericana: 2004

References

External links
 
  Argentine Primera statistics

1971 births
Living people
Sportspeople from Buenos Aires Province
Association football midfielders
Argentine footballers
Club Atlético Platense footballers
Estudiantes de La Plata footballers
Club Atlético Independiente footballers
Toulouse FC players
Boca Juniors footballers
Argentine expatriate footballers
Argentine Primera División players
Ligue 1 players
Expatriate footballers in France
Argentine people of Italian descent
Argentine expatriate sportspeople in France